Jean Miotte (1926-March 1, 2016) was a French abstract painter, in the style known as L'Art Informel. His work was preserved and studied by the Miotte Foundation and is in the collections of museums including: MoMA and the Guggenheim in New York, Musée d'Art Moderne de Paris and Haus der Kunst in Munich.

Recent exhibitions 

 2000: Museum am Ostwall, Dortmund, Allemagne

 2009: Retrospective, Exposition Galerie Daniel Besseiche, Paris

 2021: Diane de Polignac Gallery, Paris (3 juin - 3 juillet)

References

External links

jeanmiotte.com

French painters
1926 births
2016 deaths